Genocide is a 1981 American documentary by Arnold Schwartzman.

Summary
The film documents the history of the Holocaust and the reminiscences of those who survived it in support of the fact that, as one of the survivors stated, it can happen again with the rise of anti-Semitism.

Accolades
It won the Academy Award for Best Documentary Feature, the first Holocaust film to win such an honor.

Reception 

Michael Berenbaum, project director of the United States Holocaust Memorial Museum described the movie as "a substantive piece of work" but "watching it is like sitting in a dentist's chair where the drill begins at the first moment and doesn't let up till the end of the two hours. If it had, it might have been more effective. In a real sense, that is Marvin Hier."

See also
1981 in film
List of Holocaust films

References

External links

Genocide at Moriah Films
Emanuel Levy's review of the 1981 Oscar-winning documentary film

1981 films
American documentary films
Best Documentary Feature Academy Award winners
1981 documentary films
Documentary films about the Holocaust
Films scored by Elmer Bernstein
Simon Wiesenthal Center
1980s English-language films
1980s American films